Ónod is a village in Borsod-Abaúj-Zemplén County in northeastern Hungary. There are around 2,000 people living there. Ónod has a long history reflected by some of the older buildings in the town, including the castle and post carriage stopping point.

Gallery

References

Populated places in Borsod-Abaúj-Zemplén County